Schefflera parvifoliolata is a species of plant in the family Araliaceae. It is endemic to China.

References

parvifoliolata
Endemic flora of China
Critically endangered plants
Taxonomy articles created by Polbot